I Can't Help It is a 1992 Betty Carter compilation album. It contains all of the tracks from her albums Out There with Betty Carter (Peacock Records, 1958) and The Modern Sound of Betty Carter (ABC-Paramount Records, 1960). The same combination of tracks had previously been released as a double LP by ABC Records under the title What a Little Moonlight Can Do.

The title track, "I Can't Help It", was the first of Carter's own compositions that she recorded.

Track listing 
 "I Can't Help It" (Betty Carter) – 2:44
 "By the Bend of the River" (Clara Edwards) – 2:07
 "Babe's Blues" (Jon Hendricks, Randy Weston) – 2:49
 "You're Getting to Be a Habit with Me" (Al Dubin, Harry Warren) – 2:30
 "But Beautiful" (Sonny Burke, Jimmy Van Heusen) – 3:58
 "All I Got" (David Cole) – 2:15
 "You're Driving Me Crazy (What Did I Do?)" (Walter Donaldson) – 1:45
 "Foul Play" (Norman Mapp) – 2:21
 "On the Isle of May" (Mack David, André Kostelanetz) – 2:02
 "Make It Last" (Dick Haymes, Bill Paxton) – 4:30
 "The Bluebird of Happiness" (Sandor Harmati, Edward Heyman) – 1:30
 "Something Wonderful" (Oscar Hammerstein II, Richard Rodgers) – 3:37
 "For You" (Burke, Dubin) – 2:20
 "What a Little Moonlight Can Do" (Harry M. Woods) – 2:04
 "Remember" (Irving Berlin) – 2:24
 "At Sundown" (Donaldson) – 2:42
 "Mean to Me" (Fred E. Ahlert, Roy Turk) – 2:04
 "I Don't Want to Set the World on Fire" (Bennie Benjamin, Eddie Durham, Sol Marcus, Eddie Seiler) – 2:22
 "On the Alamo" (Isham Jones, Gus Kahn) – 1:55
 "Jazz (Ain't Nothin' But Soul)" (Mapp) – 1:56
 "There's No You" (Tom Adair, George Durgom, Hal Hopper) – 3:08
 "Stormy Weather" (Harold Arlen, Ted Koehler) – 3:21
 "My Reverie" (Larry Clinton, Claude Debussy) – 2:47
 "Don't Weep for the Lady" (Darshan Singh) – 3:00

Personnel 
Recorded February 1958, New York City, New York, USA (tracks 1–6):
 Betty Carter – vocals
 Ray Copeland – trumpet, arranger
 Melba Liston – trombone, arranger
 Jerome Richardson – tenor saxophone, flute, bass clarinet
 Wynton Kelly – piano
 Peck Morrison – double bass
 Specs Wright – drums

Recorded February 1958, in New York City, New York, USA (tracks 7–12):
 Betty Carter – vocals
 Kenny Dorham, Ray Copeland – trumpets
 Melba Liston – trombone
 Gigi Gryce, Jimmy Powell – alto saxophones
 Benny Golson – tenor saxophone
 Sahib Shihab – baritone saxophone
 Wynton Kelly – piano
 Sam Jones – double bass
Arrangements by Copeland, Liston, Gryce, Golson & Tommy Bryce

Recorded August 18, 29, and 30, 1960, in New York City, New York, USA (tracks 13–24):
 Betty Carter – vocals
 Orchestra arranged and conducted by Richard Weiss

Betty Carter albums
1992 compilation albums
GRP Records compilation albums
Impulse! Records compilation albums